Bolzplatz-Duell is a German television series.

See also
List of German television series

2010 German television series debuts
2010 German television series endings
German-language television shows
German sports television series
German children's television series